Beneath Western Skies is a 1944 American Western film directed by Spencer Gordon Bennet and written by Albert DeMond and Robert Creighton Williams. The film stars Robert Livingston, Smiley Burnette, Effie Laird, Frank Jaquet, Tom London and Charles Miller. The film was released on March 3, 1944, by Republic Pictures.

Plot

Cast  
Robert Livingston as Johnny Revere 
Smiley Burnette as Sheriff Frog Millhouse
Effie Laird as Carrie Stokes
Frank Jaquet as Sam Webster
Tom London as Earl Phillips
Charles Miller as Lem Toller
Joe Strauch Jr. as Tadpole Millhouse
LeRoy Mason as Bull Bricker
Kenne Duncan as Deputy Barrow
Charles Dorety as The Drunk
Jack Kirk as Wainwright
Bud Geary as Henchman Hank

See also
List of American films of 1944

References

External links
 

1944 films
1940s English-language films
American Western (genre) films
1944 Western (genre) films
Republic Pictures films
Films directed by Spencer Gordon Bennet
American black-and-white films
1940s American films